The Oregon Challenger was a tournament for professional female tennis players played on outdoor hard courts. The event was classified as a $50,000 ITF Women's Circuit tournament and was held in Portland, Oregon, United States, in 2013.

Past finals

Singles

Doubles

External links 
 Official website
 ITF search

ITF Women's World Tennis Tour
Hard court tennis tournaments in the United States
2013 establishments in Oregon
Tennis in Oregon